The Hoosac Tunnel and Wilmington Railroad (HTW) was an interstate shortline railroad running north-south between southwestern Vermont and northwestern Massachusetts. In Rowe, passengers could transfer to the east-west mainline of the Fitchburg Railroad.

History
In 1886 control of the trackage in Massachusetts was transferred to the Hoosac Tunnel and Wilmington Railroad. However, the final  of track to Wilmington were not laid until 1892, when control of the entire line was transferred to the HT&W.

The railroad was used to haul materials for the Somerset Dam in 1911, and the Harriman Dam in 1924, both of which were owned by the New England Power Company, which purchased the railroad in 1920. Originally the power company did not want to relocate the portion of the railroad flooded by the Harriman Dam, but was forced to by the citizens of Wilmington. The power company sold the railroad to local investors in 1928, who operated the railroad until a major flood in 1936 destroyed a bridge near Mountain Mills in Vermont. The railroad was sold again at that time, and the portion north of Readsboro was abandoned in 1937. Operations continued on the remaining portion until 1971, when the line was finally abandoned.

Before 2011, the northern  of the HT&W roadbed were converted for use as a rail trail.

Stations

Massachusetts
Hoosac Tunnel
Logan's
Heywood's
Monroe Bridge

Vermont
Sherman
Readsboro
Whittingham
Jacksonville
Mountain Mills
Wilmington

Popular nicknames for the HT&W included "the Hoot, Toot, and Whistle" and the "hold tight and whimper."

References

Further reading
Jones, Robert C., Railroads of Vermont, Volume II, 1993

External links

 HoosacTunnel.net Historical pictures and statistics

Defunct Vermont railroads
Defunct Massachusetts railroads
Narrow gauge railroads in Massachusetts
Narrow gauge railroads in Vermont
3 ft gauge railways in the United States